The Bell Building is an office building located in downtown Montgomery, Alabama.  It was built in 1907 by local businessman Newton J. Bell, and was the tallest building in Montgomery at the time.  It was added to the National Register of Historic Places in 1981. The height of the building is 187 feet.

The entire 12th floor and the roof were rented by the Beauvoir Club (the predecessor of the Montgomery Country Club), which had sold their mansion on Perry Street and signed a ten-year lease for the Bell Building.

Revitalization
The Bell Building underwent a multimillion-dollar revitalization to transform the building into high-end apartments and some retail space on the ground levels.

See also
National Register of Historic Places listings in Montgomery County, Alabama

References

National Register of Historic Places in Montgomery, Alabama
Buildings and structures in Montgomery, Alabama
Commercial buildings completed in 1907
Commercial buildings on the National Register of Historic Places in Alabama